Bloomingdale is a historic home located at Queenstown, Queen Anne's County, Maryland.  It  is a Federal style, -story, Flemish bond brick mansion.  The main block measures approximately 51 feet long by 37 feet deep, and was built in 1792.  A brick hyphen and wing are attached on the southeast.

It was listed on the National Register of Historic Places in 1972.

References

External links
, including photo from 1968, at Maryland Historical Trust

Houses on the National Register of Historic Places in Maryland
Houses in Queen Anne's County, Maryland
Federal architecture in Maryland
Houses completed in 1792
National Register of Historic Places in Queen Anne's County, Maryland